Maximilian O'Dempsey, 3rd Viscount Clanmalier (died 1691) was an Irish aristocrat.

He was the son of Lewis O'Dempsey, 2nd Viscount Clanmalier and succeeded him in 1683. He was of mixed Gaelic and Old English descent. He was a Roman Catholic and a supporter of his fellow Catholic King James II during the Williamite War in Ireland. He was appointed Governor of Queen's County by James and attended the Irish House of Lords in the Patriot Parliament of 1689.

He died in 1691. Although he had been married twice, to Anne Bermingham and Margaret FitzMaurice, he was childless and his position as Clan Chief was inherited by his younger brother, Terence O'Dempsey, who fled to Cheshire, England after the confiscation of the family estates carrying with him the original King Charles 1st Title document. This Terence was the ancestor of James Dempsey of Liverpool, a notable Georgian period merchant and ship owner and General sir Miles Dempsey, who commanded the British 2nd Army at D-Day during WW2.

References

Bibliography
 D'Alton, John. King James's Irish Army List. The Celtic Bookshop, 1997

17th-century Irish people
Year of birth unknown
1714 deaths
People from County Laois
Viscounts in the Peerage of Ireland
Irish Jacobites
Members of the Irish House of Lords